Zamudas (Zambdas, Zabdas, Bazas) of Jerusalem was the thirty-seventh bishop of Jerusalem.  His patriarchate lasted from 276 to 283.  He is venerated as a saint and is connected with the legend of the Theban Legion.

External links 
 Saints of February 19: Zambdas of Jerusalem

Saints from the Holy Land
3rd-century bishops of Jerusalem
3rd-century Christian saints